Normanton-on-Cliffe, sometimes known as Normanton, is a village and civil parish in the South Kesteven district of Lincolnshire, England.

Historic edifices
The now redundant parish church dates from the 11th century and is dedicated to Saint Nicholas of Myra. It is a Grade II* listed building in the care of the Churches Conservation Trust.

The village has an early 19th-century milestone and village pump, which is Grade II listed as a scheduled monument, standing next to the main Grantham to Lincoln road. The inscription on the milestone reads: "From Lincoln 18 miles, from Grantham 7 miles, from London 117 miles".

See also
St Nicholas' Church, Normanton

References

External links

Villages in Lincolnshire
Civil parishes in Lincolnshire
South Kesteven District